Dijar Nikqi (born 20 October 2004) is an Albanian footballer who plays as a centre-forward for Tirana in the Kategoria Superiore.

Club career

Early career and Laçi
Nikqi is a product of youth team systems of the different Kosovan and Albanian sides. In the summer 2020 transfer window, he joined with Kategoria Superiore club Laçi. His debut with Laçi came on 1 November in the 2020–21 Albanian Cup first round against Vora after coming on as a substitute at 57th minute in place of Kyrian Nwabueze.

Akademia e Futbollit
At the start of January 2021, Nikqi joined with Albanian club Akademia e Futbollit. His debut with Akademia e Futbollit came on 9 January in a 2020–21 Albanian Cup U19 match against Butrinti after being named in the starting line-up and scored his side's three goals during a 3–2 away win.

Tirana
At the start of January 2022, Nikqi joined with Kategoria Superiore club Tirana. His debut with Tirana came on 20 February against Kastrioti after coming on as a substitute at 82nd minute in place of Redon Xhixha and scored his side's only goal during a 1–2 away defeat.

International career
On 21 July 2018, Nikqi was selected by the Peja selection of Kosovo U15. In October 2020, he received the Albanian passport and this paved the way for him to represent Albania. On 5 August 2021, Nikqi received a call-up from Albania U18 for the friendly match against Italy U18, and made his debut after being named in the starting line-up. Twenty-two days later, he received a call-up from Albania U21 for the 2023 UEFA European Under-21 Championship qualification match against Czech Republic U21, and made his debut after coming on as a substitute at 46th minute in place of Bernard Karrica.

Honours

Club 
Tirana
Kategoria Superiore: 2021–22
Albanian Supercup: 2022

References

External links

2004 births
Living people
Sportspeople from Peja
Albanian footballers
Albania youth international footballers
Albania under-21 international footballers
Kosovan footballers
Kosovo Albanians
Kosovan expatriate footballers
Kosovan expatriate sportspeople in Albania
Association football forwards
KF Laçi players
Akademia e Futbollit players
Kategoria Superiore players
KF Tirana players